This is a list of intangible cultural heritage elements in Saudi Arabia. Seven elements in Saudi Arabia were inscribed on the Representative List of the Intangible Cultural Heritage of Humanity.

List of elements

See also 

 List of World Heritage Sites in Saudi Arabia
 Saudi Heritage Preservation Society

References 

Saudi Arabian culture
Cultural heritage by country
Arab culture
Saudi Arabia-related lists
Saudi Arabia